Pembroke Castle is a medieval castle in the centre of Pembroke, Pembrokeshire in Wales. The castle was the original family seat of the Earldom of Pembroke. A Grade I listed building since 1951, it underwent major restoration during the early 20th century.

In 1093, Arnulf of Montgomery built the first castle at the site when he fortified the promontory beside the Pembroke River during the Norman invasion of Wales. A century later, the castle was given by Richard I to William Marshal, who became one of the most powerful men in 12th-century Britain. He rebuilt Pembroke Castle in stone, creating most of the structure that remains today. The castle is open to the public and is the largest privately owned castle in Wales.

Construction
The castle is sited on a strategic rocky promontory by the Milford Haven Waterway. The first fortification on the site was a Norman motte-and-bailey. It had earthen ramparts and a timber palisade.

In 1189, Pembroke Castle was acquired by William Marshal. He soon became Lord Marshal of England, and set about turning the earth and wood fort into an impressive Norman stone castle. The inner ward, which was constructed first, contains the huge round keep with its domed roof. Its original first-floor entrance was through an external stairwell. Inside, a spiral staircase connected its four stories. The keep's domed roof also has several putlog holes that supported a wooden fighting-platform. If the castle was attacked, the hoarding allowed defenders to go out beyond the keep's massive walls above the heads of the attackers.

The inner ward's curtain wall had a large horseshoe-shaped gateway. But only a thin wall was required along the promontory. This section of the wall has a small observation turret and a square stone platform. Domestic buildings including William Marshal's Great Hall and private apartments were within the inner ward.

In the late 13th century, additional buildings were added to the inner ward, including a new Great Hall. A 55-step spiral staircase was also created that led down to a large limestone cave, known as Wogan Cavern, beneath the castle. The cave, which was created by natural water erosion, was fortified with a wall, a barred gateway and arrowslits. It may have served as a boathouse or a sallyport to the river where cargo or people could have been transferred.

The outer ward was defended by a large twin-towered gatehouse, a barbican and several round towers.

Although Pembroke Castle is a Norman-style enclosure castle with great keep, it can be more accurately described as a linear fortification because, like the later 13th-century castles at Caernarfon and Conwy, it was built on a rocky promontory surrounded by water. This meant that attacking forces could only assault on a narrow front. Architecturally, Pembroke's thickest walls and towers are all concentrated on its landward side facing the town, with Pembroke River providing a natural defense around the rest of its perimeter.

History 
Pembroke Castle stands on a site that has been occupied at least since the Roman period. Roger de Montgomerie, 1st Earl of Shrewsbury founded the first castle here in the 11th century. Although only made from earth and wood, Pembroke Castle resisted several Welsh attacks and sieges over the next 30 years. The castle was established at the heart of the Norman-controlled lands of southwest Wales. Arnulf de Montgomery appointed Gerald de Windsor as his castellan at Pembroke.

When William Rufus died, Arnulf de Montgomery joined his elder brother, Robert of Bellême, in rebellion against Henry I, William's brother and successor as king; when the rebellion failed, he was forced to forfeit all his British lands and titles. Henry appointed his castellan, but when the chosen ally turned out to be incompetent, the King reappointed Gerald in 1102. By 1138 King Stephen had given Pembroke Castle to Gilbert de Clare who used it as an important base in the Norman invasion of Ireland.

In August 1189 Richard I arranged the marriage of Isabel, de Clare's granddaughter, to William Marshal who received both the castle and the title, Earl of Pembroke. He had the castle rebuilt in stone and established the great keep at the same time. Marshal was succeeded in turn by each of his five sons. His third son, Gilbert Marshal, was responsible for enlarging and further strengthening the castle between 1234 and 1241. All of Marshal's sons died childless. In 1247, the castle was inherited by William de Valence (a half-brother of Henry III), who had become Earl of Pembroke through his marriage to Joan de Munchensi, William Marshal's granddaughter. 

The de Valence family held Pembroke for 70 years. During this time, the town was fortified with defensive walls, three main gates and a postern. Pembroke Castle became de Valence's military base for fighting the Welsh princes during the conquest of North Wales by Edward I between 1277 and 1295. On the death of Aymer de Valence, 2nd Earl of Pembroke, William de Valence's son, the castle passed through marriage to the Hastings family. In 1389, 17-year-old John Hastings died in a jousting accident, ending a line of inheritance stretching back 250 years.

Pembroke Castle then reverted to Richard II. Short tenancies were then granted by The Crown for its ownership. By 1400 Owain Glyndŵr had begun a rebellion in Wales. However, Pembroke escaped attack because the castle's Constable, Francis а Court, paid off Glyndŵr in gold. Then in 1452, the castle and the earldom were presented to Jasper Tudor by his half-brother Henry VI. Tudor brought his widowed sister-in-law, Margaret Beaufort, to Pembroke where, in 1457, she gave birth to her only child, who was to become King Henry VII of England.

In the 15th and 16th centuries, the castle was a place of peace until the outbreak of the English Civil War. Although most of South Wales sided with the King, Pembroke declared for Parliament. It was besieged by Royalist troops but was saved after Parliamentary reinforcements arrived by sea from nearby Milford Haven. Parliamentary forces then went on to capture the Royalist castles of Tenby, Haverfordwest and Carew. 

In 1648, at the beginning of the Second Civil War, Pembroke's commander Colonel John Poyer led a Royalist uprising alongside Colonel Powell, Tenby Castle, and Sir Nicholas Kemoys, Chepstow Castle. Oliver Cromwell came to Pembroke on 24 May 1648 and took the castle after a seven-week siege. Its three leaders were found guilty of treason and Cromwell ordered the castle to be destroyed. Townspeople were even encouraged to disassemble the fortress and re-use its stone for their purposes.

The castle was then abandoned and allowed to decay. It remained in ruins until 1880, when a three-year restoration project was undertaken. Nothing further was done until 1928, when Major-General Sir Ivor Philipps acquired the castle and began an extensive restoration of the castle's walls, gatehouses, and towers. After his death, a trust was set up for the castle, jointly managed by the Philipps family and Pembroke town council.

Archaeology 

In July 2022, archaeological survey funded by the Natural History Museum and the British Cave Research Society uncovered evidence of prehistoric megafauna such as reindeer and woolly mammoth bones, in addition to seashells, pigs and deer at Wogan Cavern. According to the researchers, the cave was occupied by residents as far back as the Paleolithic and Mesolithic Periods.

Film location
Pembroke has appeared in numerous feature films. These include the 1968 film The Lion in Winter, the 1976 film Jabberwocky, the BBC adaptation of C.S. Lewis's Prince Caspian, the film of Shakespeare's Richard II, and the 2016 Anglo-American romantic film Me Before You. It features as the fictional Penleven Castle in Cornwall in the 2015 comedy film The Bad Education Movie.

References

Further reading

External links

 
 Pembroke Castle: description and sources

 Castles in Pembrokeshire
 Castle ruins in Wales
 Grade I listed buildings in Pembrokeshire
 Grade I listed castles in Wales
 Pembroke, Pembrokeshire